Behind the Camera: The Cinematographer's Art is the fifth book by Leonard Maltin regarding movies.  It was first published in 1971, and the book itself is divided into two parts.  The first part is an introduction to the film industry that cites technically well-done movies as well as the contributions of the cameramen—the later cinematographers -- to making their impact.  The second part contains each of Maltin's interviews with five of the leading cinematographers (as of 1970): Arthur C. Miller, Hal Mohr, Hal Rosson, Lucien Ballard, and Conrad Hall.  Behind the Camera is illustrated with samples of their best work and contains a listing of the Academy Awards for Best Cinematography from 1927 to 1970.
Also there are producers, make up personnel, editors, special effects staff, technicians, writers, the camera men and more.

1971 non-fiction books
Cinematography
Books about film